Suzana Ćebić (born November 9, 1984 in Kosjerić, Serbia) is a volleyball player from Serbia, playing as a libero for CSM Volei Alba Blaj.

Career
Suzana was a member of the Women's National Team until 2017 (when she retired to make room for the youngsters) that won the silver medal at the 2007 European Championship in Belgium and Luxembourg. Ćebić was named "Best Libero" at the 2006 FIVB Women's World Championship, where Serbia claimed the bronze medal.

Ćebić won the silver medal in the 2012 FIVB Club World Championship, playing with the Azerbaijani club Rabita Baku.

Awards

Individuals
 2006 World Championship "Best Libero"
 2011 European Championship "Best Libero"
 2013 European Championship "Best Receiver"

National Team

Senior Team
 2009 European League -  Gold Medal
 2010 European League -  Gold Medal
 2011 European Championship -  Gold Medal

Clubs
 2003 Serbian Cup -  Champion, with Crnokosa Kosjerić
 2006 Serbian Championship -  Champion, with Jedinstvo Užice
 2008 Spanish Supercup -  Champion, with Tenerife Marichal
 2010 Romanian Championship -  Champion, with Metal Galaţi
 2010 Romanian Cup -  Champion, with Metal Galaţi
 2012 FIVB Club World Championship -  Runner-Up, with Rabita Baku
 2012–13 CEV Champions League -  Runner-Up, with Rabita Baku
 2012-13 Azerbaijan Super League -  Champion, with Rabita Baku

References

External links
 FIVB Profile

1984 births
Living people
People from Kosjerić
Serbian women's volleyball players
Olympic volleyball players of Serbia
Volleyball players at the 2008 Summer Olympics
Volleyball players at the 2012 Summer Olympics
European champions for Serbia
Serbian expatriate sportspeople in Spain
Serbian expatriate sportspeople in Romania
Expatriate volleyball players in Romania
Serbian expatriate sportspeople in Germany
Serbian expatriate sportspeople in Azerbaijan
Serbian expatriate sportspeople in China